AD 88 (LXXXVIII) was a leap year starting on Tuesday (link will display the full calendar) of the Julian calendar. At the time, it was known as the Year of the Consulship of Augustus and Rufus (or, less frequently, year 841 Ab urbe condita). The denomination AD 88 for this year has been used since the early medieval period, when the Anno Domini calendar era became the prevalent method in Europe for naming years.

Events

By place

Roman Empire 
 Two Egyptian obelisks are erected in Benevento in front of the Temple of Isis, in honour of Emperor Domitian. 
 Quintilian retires from teaching and from pleading, to compose his great work on the training of the orator (Institutio Oratoria).
 The First Dacian War ends: Decebalus becomes a client king of Rome, he receives money, craftsmen and war machines to protect the borders (limes) of the Roman Empire.

Asia 
 Emperor Han Zhangdi dies at age 31 after a 13-year reign in which Chinese military forces have become powerful enough to march against tribes who threaten their northern and western borders. Having used intrigue as well as armed might to achieve his ends, Zhangdi and his General Ban Chao have reestablished Chinese influence in Inner Asia, but court eunuchs have increased their power during the emperor's reign. Zhangdi is succeeded by his 9-year-old son Zhao, who will reign until 105 as emperor Han Hedi, but he will be a virtual pawn of Empress Dou (adoptive mother) and scheming courtiers who will effectively rule the Chinese Empire. 
 Last year (4th) of yuanhe era and start of zhanghe era of the Chinese Eastern Han Dynasty.

By topic

Religion 
 Pope Clement I succeeds Pope Anacletus I as the fourth pope.
</onlyinclude>

Deaths 
 Dou Gu, Chinese general of the Han Dynasty
 Gaius Vettulenus Civica Cerealis, Roman politician  
 Han Zhangdi, Chinese emperor of the Han Dynasty (b. AD 57)

References 

0088